Sheikh Humayun (born 1 January 1986) is a Bangladeshi cricketer. He made his List A debut for Uttara Sporting Club in the 2018–19 Dhaka Premier Division Cricket League on 27 March 2019.

References

External links
 

1986 births
Living people
Bangladeshi cricketers
Uttara Sporting Club cricketers
Place of birth missing (living people)